Gordon Walker may refer to:

Gordon Walker (businessman) (born 1941), Canadian businessman and former politician
Gordie Walker (born 1965), Canadian former professional ice hockey player
Gordon Beverly Walker (1891–1954), Canadian politician and Alberta MLA from 1926 to 1935
Gordon Walker (coach) (born c. 1983), New Zealand canoeing coach
Gordon Walker (professor), professor in the Department of Geography at Lancaster University
Gordon Walker (piper) (born 1967), bagpipe player
Gordon Walker (priest) (died 1916), Dean of Achonry
Gordon Walker, a fictional character from the American television series Supernatural

See also
Patrick Gordon Walker (1907–1980), British Labour Party politician
Thomas Gordon Walker (1849–1917), British Indian civil servant